The Wrong Man is a 1956 film directed by Alfred Hitchcock.

The Wrong Man may also refer to:

The Wrong Man (1917 film), a 1917 film starring Harry Carey
The Wrong Man (1993 film), a 1993 film starring Rosanna Arquette
Lucky Number Slevin, a 2006 film, released in Australia as "The Wrong Man"
"Wrong Man", a song by Paul Gilbert from his 1998 album Flying Dog
"Wrong Man", a song by Deep Purple from their 2005 album Rapture of the Deep
Wrong Man, a 2018 six-part docuseries by Joe Berlinger
The Wrong Man, a musical (2014), album (2019), and movie (2019) by Ross Golan

See also

The Wrong Mans, a 2013 comedy thriller series starring James Corden and Mathew Baynton
The Wrong Guy, a 1997 comedy film starring David Foley